Pombur is an Indian village near Vikravandi. It is located between three towns Villupuram, Pondicherry and Tindivanam.

Cities and towns in Viluppuram district